Orchard Grove is an unincorporated community in Cedar Creek Township, Lake County, Indiana.

A post office was established at Orchard Grove in 1854, and remained in operation until it was discontinued in 1904.

Geography

References

Unincorporated communities in Lake County, Indiana
Unincorporated communities in Indiana